Heinrich Kleisli (October 19, 1930 – April 5, 2011) was a Swiss mathematician.  He is the namesake of several constructions in category theory, including the Kleisli category and Kleisli triples.  He is also the namesake of the Kleisli Query System, a tool for integration of heterogeneous databases developed at the University of Pennsylvania.

Kleisli earned his Ph.D. at ETH Zurich in 1960, having been supervised by Beno Eckmann and Ernst Specker.  His dissertation was on homotopy and abelian categories.  He served as an associate professor at the University of Ottawa before relocating to the University of Fribourg in 1966.  He became a full professor at Fribourg in 1967.

External links 
 
 In memoriam: Prof. emerit. Heinrich Kleisli
  

2011 deaths
1930 births
Swiss mathematicians
ETH Zurich alumni
Academic staff of the University of Ottawa
Academic staff of the University of Fribourg